Slipstream is a 1989 science fiction film directed by Steven Lisberger, who had previously directed the cult classic 1982 science fiction film Tron. It was produced by Gary Kurtz, best known for his collaboration with George Lucas on the first two Star Wars films and American Graffiti. Slipstream reunited Kurtz with his Star Wars lead Mark Hamill, who features alongside Bill Paxton, Bob Peck and Kitty Aldridge, with cameo appearances from Robbie Coltrane, Ben Kingsley and F. Murray Abraham.

Plot
A voiceover sets the scene: the time is after the Harmonic Convergence, when drastic climate change has swept away civilization as we know it. A vast wind current, the Slipstream, encircles the globe, and a few scattered settlements of survivors attempt to keep human life going.

An aeroplane pursues a man running down a canyon, cornering him at a precipice. The plane lands, and its occupants, bounty hunters Will Tasker and Belitski, chase the man and shoot him with a grappling hook. The fugitive looks at his arm, but seems intrigued rather than distressed. Tasker pulls on the rope and the man tumbles down the side of the canyon, but he is not harmed. Immediately after his fall, the fugitive quotes from the aviator and poet John Gillespie Magee, Jr.: "I have slipped the surly bonds of Earth, put out my hand and touched the Face of God."

The bounty hunters take their prisoner to a busy airstrip, where he stands beside them, handcuffed, as they eat in the diner. Matt Owens, a smalltime arms dealer, nearly gets his arm broken when he makes a pass at Belitski, then tries to sell contraband to Tasker. It is then revealed that Tasker and Belitski are part of the remnants of a law enforcement agency, trying to keep the peace in a post-apocalyptic society. Tasker seizes some of Owens' goods. However, as the pair are leaving, Owens abducts their prisoner so that he can claim the large reward. Tasker shoots Owens with a dart, telling him that it is poisoned; but it also implants a tracking device in Owens' body, enabling Belitski and Tasker to follow them.

Owens first flies to his home, Hell's Kitchen. On the way, the prisoner quotes from the poetry of Byron, and misunderstanding, Owens begins to call him Byron. After their arrival at Hell's Kitchen, Byron heals a boy blinded by cataracts, and Owens begins to wonder if Byron is more than he appears. After getting lost, they land at the home of a cult of cave-dwellers who worship the Slipstream and who have recently been under attack by bandits. Byron attempts to help, lifting a heavy milling stone off Avatar, the cult's leader. Avatar, in his dying words, curses Byron as being part of the out-of-control technological advancements that led to the apocalyptic Convergence. The cultists decide to let the wind decide what to do with Byron, and tie him to a massive kite in the wind.

The bounty hunters arrive in the middle of a windstorm, and Owens bargains with them to work together to get Byron down. Tasker reveals to Owens that Byron is an android. After a rough landing from the destroyed kite, Belitski allows Byron and Owens to get away. Another visitor to the valley, Ariel, helps them escape and convinces them to take her to her former home. Ariel introduces them to her people, who inhabit a fortified underground museum. Byron's knowledge and appreciation of the museum's ancient contents lead Ariel to become emotionally attached to him. Byron and Ariel spend the night together, while Owens gets drunk and hooks up with a girl in the community. The girl helps Owens decide to free Byron, who has become his friend. Later, Byron reveals that the man he killed was his master; he himself was designed as the man's companion, and when the man asked him to end his life, he obeyed, even though he was programmed to do no harm. Byron also excitedly tells Matt that he has slept for the first time, and that he dreamed of a land at the end of the Slipstream, inhabited by other androids.

Having tracked the trio to the museum, Tasker and Belitski force entry, killing guards and some inhabitants. After beating the Curator, Tasker forces the rest to find the fugitives. Byron is captured while Belitski shoots Owens in the chest with a dart; Owens retaliates by knocking her out and handcuffing her to a bed. She wakes and explains that the dart is the antidote to the poison. Owens engages in a shootout with Tasker in which Ariel is killed. Enraged at her death, Byron pursues Tasker to his plane. Tasker shoots Byron to no effect, then tries to run him down with the plane as he takes off. However, Byron manages to climb on and smash his way into the cockpit. As Byron is on the verge of killing him, Tasker quotes the Magee poem, and he relents. He then attempts to regain control of the damaged aircraft by using the control wires, but it crashes. Tasker is killed, but Byron survives; he is apparently indestructible. He returns to the museum to find that Belitski has consented to become Owens' partner; they fly off together. Byron leaves to seek his promised land.

Cast

 Mark Hamill as Will Tasker
 Kitty Aldridge as Belitski
 Bill Paxton as Matt Owens
 Bob Peck as Byron
 Eleanor David as Ariel
 Robbie Coltrane as Montclaire
 Ben Kingsley as Avatar
 F. Murray Abraham as Cornelius

Production
Slipstream was the second feature Gary Kurtz made as a producer after splitting from his former creative partner George Lucas. Kurtz's early production credits included the films Chandler and Monte Hellman's cult road movie Two Lane Blacktop (1971). He then began his hugely successful collaboration with George Lucas by producing Lucas' commercial breakthrough, the low-budget American Graffiti (1973), which went on to become one of the most profitable films of all time. Kurtz then produced, worked as a second-unit director, and played a major creative role in the first two Star Wars films, but the partnership ended acrimoniously in the interval between Empire and the third installment of the series, Return of the Jedi, when Lucas and Kurtz fell out over the creative and commercial direction of the franchise.

Following the acrimonious split with Lucas, Kurtz produced the hit fantasy film The Dark Crystal in 1982. Afterwards, he acted as executive producer on the fantasy film Return to Oz in 1985, which was not a commercial success. He evidently hoped that he could recapture his earlier success in science fiction with Slipstream, which co-starred popular actors from two of the major sci-fi franchises of the period - Hamill from Star Wars, and Paxton from Aliens. However, in spite of the many prominent names involved, including Kurtz, the cast, and distinguished Hollywood composer Elmer Bernstein, Slipstream proved to be a disastrous financial and critical flop. Its failure reportedly drove Kurtz into bankruptcy.

Slipstream was filmed in Cappadocia, Turkey, Ireland, and Pinewood Studios, Iver Heath, Buckinghamshire, England, UK.

Release
Slipstream had a short cinema run in the United Kingdom, where it was considered a flop, and Australia, where the film grossed just $66,836 during its entire theatrical run. The film was never released in theaters in North America and enjoyed only moderate VHS sales. The film was released on videocassette by M.C.E.G. Virgin Home Entertainment in 1990. Several budget DVD copies of Slipstream have been released. Fans awaiting a director's cut have been disappointed after producer Gary Kurtz said in an interview that the script was originally much more violent, but that these violent scenes, which would have made the plot more coherent, were never filmed.

It has also been released as a DVD double feature by "Destra Entertainment – Payless", the other feature being 1967's In the Year 2889; it was also distributed in Australia by Showtime DVD as a double feature entitled "Action", along with ''Midnight Cop.

As of December 2019, the film has a "no consensus" score on Rotten Tomatoes of 43%.

References

External links
 
 
 
 Slipstream at Moria film review

1989 films
1980s science fiction action films
British aviation films
British science fiction action films
British chase films
Films scored by Elmer Bernstein
Films directed by Steven Lisberger
Films produced by Gary Kurtz
Films shot in Buckinghamshire
Films shot in Ireland
Films shot in Turkey
Films shot at Pinewood Studios
British post-apocalyptic films
1980s chase films
1980s English-language films
1980s British films